The women's 800 metre freestyle event at the 1992 Summer Olympics took place on 30 July at the Piscines Bernat Picornell in Barcelona, Spain.

Records
Prior to this competition, the existing world and Olympic records were as follows.

Results

Heats
Rule: The eight fastest swimmers advance to final (Q).

Final

References

External links
 Official Report

Swimming at the 1992 Summer Olympics
Olympic
Women's events at the 1992 Summer Olympics